The 1997–1998 season was Kavala' 2nd straight season on the Greek first tier and their 3rd first-tier season in the 1990s. The team managed a league placement below middle, and reached the third round of the cup.

Players

Squad

|}

Players who left during the season

|}

Managers
Grzegorz Lato: start of season – 16 September 1997
Kostas Iosifidis: 16 September 1997 – 5 January 1998
Stelios Katrakylakis (caretaker): 5 January 1998 – 20 January 1998
Nikos Goulis: 20 January 1998 – end of season

Alpha Ethniki

League table

References
Weltfussball
Match data away vs PAOK is missing.
RSSSF

Kavala F.C. seasons
Kavala